A consul held the highest elected political office of the Roman Republic ( to 27 BC), and ancient Romans considered the consulship the second-highest level of the cursus honorum (an ascending sequence of public offices to which politicians aspired) after that of the censor. Each year, the Centuriate Assembly elected two consuls to serve jointly for a one-year term. The consuls alternated in holding fasces – taking turns leading – each month when both were in Rome. A consul's imperium extended over Rome and all its provinces.

There were two consuls in order to create a check on the power of any individual citizen in accordance with the republican belief that the powers of the former kings of Rome should be spread out into multiple offices. To that end, each consul could veto the actions of the other consul.

After the establishment of the Empire (27 BC), the consuls became mere symbolic representatives of Rome's republican heritage and held very little power and authority, with the Emperor acting as the supreme authority.

History

Under the Republic 
According to Roman tradition, after the expulsion of the last king, Tarquin Superbus, the powers and authority of the king were given to the newly instituted consulship. Originally, consuls were called praetors ("leader"), referring to their duties as the chief military commanders. By at least 300 BC the title of consul became commonly used. Ancient writers usually derive the title consul from the Latin verb consulere, "to take counsel", but this is most likely a later gloss of the term, which probably derives—in view of the joint nature of the office—from con- and sal-, "get together" or from con- and sell-/sedl-, "sit down together with" or "next to".

The consulship was believed by the Romans to date back to the traditional establishment of the Republic in 509 BC, but the succession of consuls was not continuous in the 5th century BC, when the consulship was supposedly replaced with a board of consular tribunes, which was elected whenever the military needs of the state were significant enough to warrant the election of more than the usual two consuls. These remained in place until the office was abolished in 367 BC and the consulship was reintroduced.

Consuls had extensive powers in peacetime (administrative, legislative, and judicial), and in wartime often held the highest military command. Additional religious duties included certain rites which, as a sign of their formal importance, could only be carried out by the highest state officials. Consuls also read auguries, an essential religious ritual, before leading armies into the field.

Two consuls were elected each year, serving together, each with veto power over the other's actions, a normal principle for magistracies. They were elected by the comitia centuriata, which had an aristocratic bias in its voting structure, which only increased over the years from its foundation. However, they formally assumed powers only after the ratification of their election in the older comitia curiata, which granted the consuls their imperium by enacting a law, the lex curiata de imperio.

If a consul died during his term (not uncommon when consuls were in the forefront of battle) or was removed from office, another would be elected by the comitia centuriata to serve the remainder of the term as consul suffectus ("suffect consul"). A consul elected to start the yearcalled a consul ordinarius ("ordinary consul")held more prestige than a suffect consul, partly because the year would be named for ordinary consuls (see consular dating).

According to tradition, the consulship was initially reserved for patricians and only in 367 BC did plebeians win the right to stand for this supreme office, when the Licinio-Sextian rogations provided that at least one consul each year should be plebeian. The first plebeian consul, Lucius Sextius, was elected the following year. Nevertheless, the office remained largely in the hands of a few families as, according to Gelzer, only fifteen novi homines ("new men" with no consular background) were elected to the consulship until the election of Cicero in 63 BC. Modern historians have questioned the traditional account of plebeian emancipation during the early Republic (see Conflict of the Orders), noting for instance that about thirty percent of the consuls prior to Sextius had plebeian, not patrician, names. It is possible that only the chronology has been distorted, but it seems that one of the first consuls, Lucius Junius Brutus, came from a plebeian family. Another possible explanation is that during the 5th-century social struggles, the office of consul was gradually monopolized by a patrician elite.

During times of war, the primary qualification for consul was military skill and reputation, but at all times the selection was politically charged. With the passage of time, the consulship became the normal endpoint of the cursus honorum, the sequence of offices pursued by the ambitious Roman who chose to pursue political power and influence. When Lucius Cornelius Sulla regulated the cursus by law, the minimum age of election to consul became, in effect, 42 years of age.

Beginning in the late Republic, after finishing a consular year, a former consul would usually serve a lucrative term as a proconsul, the Roman governor of one of the senatorial provinces.

It would not be uncommon for the patrician consuls of the early Republic to intersperse public office with agricultural labor. In Cicero’s words: in agris erant tum senatores, id est senes: ‘In those days senators—that is, seniors—would live on their farms’. This practice was obsolete by the 2nd century.

Under the Empire 
Although throughout the early years of the Principate the consuls were still formally elected by the comitia centuriata, they were de facto nominated by the princeps. As the years progressed, the distinction between the comitia centuriata and the comitia populi tributa (which elected the lower magisterial positions) appears to have disappeared, and so for the purposes of the consular elections, there came to be just a single "assembly of the people" which elected all the magisterial positions of the state, while the consuls continued to be nominated by the princeps.

The imperial consulate during the Principate (until the 3rd century) was an important position, albeit as the method through which the Roman aristocracy could progress through to the higher levels of imperial administration – only former consuls could become consular legates, the proconsuls of Africa and Asia, or the urban prefect of Rome. It was a post that would be occupied by a man halfway through his career, in his early thirties for a patrician, or in his early forties for most others. 

Emperors frequently appointed themselves, or their protégés or relatives, consuls, even without regard to the age requirements. Cassius Dio states that Caligula intended to make his horse Incitatus consul, but was assassinated before he could do so.

The need for a pool of men to fill the consular positions forced Augustus to remodel the suffect consulate, allowing more than the two elected for the ordinary consulate. During the reigns of the Julio-Claudians, the ordinary consuls who began the year usually relinquished their office mid-year, with the election for the suffect consuls occurring at the same time as that for the ordinary consuls. During reigns of the Flavian and Antonine emperors, the ordinary consuls tended to resign after a period of four months, and the elections were moved to 12 January of the year in which they were to hold office. Election of the consuls were transferred to the Senate during the Flavian or Antonine periods, although through to the 3rd century, the people were still called on to ratify the Senate's selections.

The proliferation of suffect consuls through this process, and the allocation of this office to homines novi tended, over time, to devalue the office. However, the high regard placed upon the ordinary consulate remained intact, as it was one of the few offices that one could share with the emperor, and during this period it was filled mostly by patricians or by individuals who had consular ancestors. If they were especially skilled or valued, they may even have achieved a second (or rarely, a third) consulate. Prior to achieving the consulate, these individuals already had a significant career behind them, and would expect to continue serving the state, filling in the post upon which the state functioned. Consequently, holding the ordinary consulship was a great honor and the office was the major symbol of the still relatively republican constitution. Probably as part of seeking formal legitimacy, the break-away Gallic Empire had its own pairs of consuls during its existence (260–274). The list of consuls for this state is incomplete, drawn from inscriptions and coins.

By the end of the 3rd century, much had changed. The loss of many pre-consular functions and the gradual encroachment of the equites into the traditional senatorial administrative and military functions, meant that senatorial careers virtually vanished prior to their appointment as consuls. This had the effect of seeing a suffect consulship granted at an earlier age, to the point that by the 4th century, it was being held by men in their early twenties, and possibly younger, without the significant political careers behind them that was normal previously. As time progressed, second consulates, usually ordinary, became far more common than had been the case during the first two centuries, while the first consulship was usually a suffect consulate. Also, the consulate during this period was no longer just the province of senators – the automatic awarding of a suffect consulship to the equestrian praetorian prefects (who were given the ornamenta consularia upon achieving their office) allowed them to style themselves cos. II when they were later granted an ordinary consulship by the emperor. All this had the effect of further devaluing the office of consul, to the point that by the final years of the 3rd century, holding an ordinary consulate was occasionally left out of the cursus inscriptions, while suffect consulships were hardly ever recorded by the first decades of the 4th century.

One of the reforms of Constantine I (r. 306–337) was to assign one of the consuls to the city of Rome, and the other to Constantinople. Therefore, when the Roman Empire was divided into two halves on the death of Theodosius I (r. 379–395), the emperor of each half acquired the right of appointing one of the consuls—although on occasion an emperor did allow his colleague to appoint both consuls for various reasons. The consulship, bereft of any real power, continued to be a great honor, but the celebrations attending it – above all the chariot races – had come to involve considerable expense, which only a few citizens could afford, to the extent that part of the expense had to be covered by the state. In the 6th century, the consulship was increasingly sparsely given, until it was allowed to lapse under Justinian I (r. 527–565): the western consulship lapsed in 534, with Decius Paulinus the last holder, and the consulship of the East in 541, with Anicius Faustus Albinus Basilius. Consular dating had already been abolished in 537, when Justinian introduced dating by the emperor's regnal year and the indiction. In the eastern court, the appointment to consulship became a part of the rite of proclamation of a new emperor from Justin II (r. 565–578) on, and is last attested in the proclamation of the future Constans II (r. 641–668) as consul in 632. In the late 9th century, Emperor Leo the Wise (r. 886–912) finally abolished consular dating with Novel 94. By that time, the Greek titles for consul and ex-consul, "hypatos" and "apo hypaton", had been transformed to relatively lowly honorary dignities.

In the west, the rank of consul was occasionally bestowed upon individuals by the Papacy. In 719, the title of Roman consul was offered by the Pope to Charles Martel, although he refused it. About 853, Alfred the Great, then a child aged four or five, was made a Roman consul by the Pope.

Powers and responsibilities

Republican duties
Traditionally, after the expulsion of the kings, all the powers that had belonged to the kings were transferred to two offices: the consulship and the office of rex sacrorum. While the rex sacrorum inherited the kings' position as royal priest and various religious functions were handed off to the pontiffs, the consuls were given the remaining civil and military responsibilities. To prevent abuse of the kingly power, this authority was shared by two consuls, each of whom could veto the other's actions, with short annual terms.

The consuls were invested with the executive power of the state and headed the government of the Republic. Initially, the consuls held vast executive and judicial power. In the gradual development of the Roman legal system, however, some important functions were detached from the consulship and assigned to new officers. Thus, in 443 BC, the responsibility to conduct the Census was taken from the consuls and given to the censors. The second function taken from the consulship was their judicial power. Their position as chief judges was transferred to the praetors in 366 BC. After this time, the consul would only serve as judges in extraordinary criminal cases and only when called upon by decree of the Senate.

Civil sphere
For the most part, power was divided between civil and military spheres. As long as the consuls were in the pomerium (the city of Rome), they were at the head of government, and all the other magistrates, with the exception of the tribune of the plebs, were subordinate to them, but retained independence of office. The internal machinery of the Republic was under the consuls’ supervision. In order to allow the consuls greater authority in executing laws, the consuls had the right of summons and arrest, which was limited only by the right of appeal from their judgement. This power of punishment even extended to inferior magistrates.

As part of their executive functions, the consuls were responsible for carrying into effect the decrees of the Senate and the laws of the assemblies. Sometimes, in great emergencies, they might act on their own authority and responsibility. The consuls also served as the chief diplomats of the Roman state. Before any foreign ambassadors reached the Senate, they met with the consuls. The consul would introduce ambassadors to the Senate, and they alone negotiated between the Senate and foreign states.

The consuls could convene the Senate, and presided over its meetings. Each consul served as president of the Senate for a month. They could also summon any of the three Roman assemblies (Curiate, Centuriate, and Tribal) and presided over them. Thus, the consuls conducted the elections and put legislative measures to the vote. When neither consul was within the city, their civic duties were assumed by the praetor urbanus.

Each consul was accompanied in every public appearance by twelve lictors, who displayed the magnificence of the office and served as his bodyguards. Each lictor held a fasces, a bundle of rods that contained an axe. The rods symbolized the power of scourging, and the axe the power of capital punishment. When inside the pomerium, the lictors removed the axes from the fasces to show that a citizen could not be executed without a trial. Upon entering the comitia centuriata, the lictors would lower the fasces to show that the powers of the consuls derive from the people.

Military sphere
Outside the walls of Rome, the powers of the consuls were far more extensive in their role as commanders-in-chief of all Roman legions. It was in this function that the consuls were vested with full imperium. When legions were ordered by a decree of the Senate, the consuls conducted the levy in the Campus Martius. Upon entering the army, all soldiers had to take their oath of allegiance to the consuls. The consuls also oversaw the gathering of troops provided by Rome's allies.

Within the city a consul could punish and arrest a citizen, but had no power to inflict capital punishment. When on campaign, however, a consul could inflict any punishment he saw fit on any soldier, officer, citizen, or ally.

Each consul commanded an army, usually two legions strong, with the help of military tribunes and a quaestor who had financial duties. In the rare case that both consuls marched together, each one held the command for a day respectively. A typical consular army was about 20,000 men and consisted of two citizen and two allied legions. In the early years of the Republic, Rome's enemies were located in central Italy, so campaigns lasted a few months. As Rome's frontiers expanded, in the 2nd century BC, the campaigns became more lengthy. Rome was a warlike society and very seldom did not wage war. So the consul upon entering office was expected by the Senate and the People to march his army against Rome's enemies, and expand the Roman frontiers. His soldiers expected to return to their homes after the campaign with spoils. If the consul won an overwhelming victory, he was hailed as imperator by his troops, and could request to be granted a triumph.

The consul could conduct the campaign as he saw fit, and had unlimited powers. However, after the campaign, he could be prosecuted for his misdeeds (for example for abusing the provinces, or wasting public money, as Scipio Africanus was accused by Cato in 205 BC).

Abuse prevention
Abuse of power by consuls was prevented with each consul given the power to veto his colleague consul. Therefore, except in the provinces as commanders-in-chief where each consul's power was supreme, the consuls could only act not against each other's determined will. Against the sentence of one consul, an appeal could be brought before his colleague, which, if successful, would see the sentence overturned. In order to avoid unnecessary conflicts, only one consul would actually perform the office's duties every month and could act without direct interference. In the next month, the consuls would switch roles with one another. This would continue until the end of the consular term.

Another point which acted as a check against consuls was the certainty that after the end of their term they would be called to account for their actions while in office.

There were also three other restrictions on consular power. Their term in office was short (one year); their duties were pre-decided by the Senate; and they could not stand again for election immediately after the end of their office. Usually a period of ten years was expected between consulships.

Governorship

After leaving office, the consuls were assigned by the Senate to a province to administer as governor. The provinces to which each consul was assigned were drawn by lot and determined before the end of his consulship. Transferring his consular imperium to proconsular imperium, the consul would become a proconsul and governor of one (or several) of Rome's many provinces. As a proconsul, his imperium was limited to only a specified province and not the entire Republic. Any exercise of proconsular imperium in any other province was illegal. Also, a proconsul was not allowed to leave his province before his term was complete or before the arrival of his successor. Exceptions were given only on special permission of the Senate. Most terms as governor lasted between one and five years.

Appointment of the dictator
In times of crisis, when Rome's territory was in immediate danger, a dictator was appointed by the consuls for a period of no more than six months, after the proposition of the Senate. While the dictator held office, the imperium of the consuls was subordinate to the dictator.

Imperial duties
After Augustus became the first Roman emperor in 27 BC with the establishment of the Principate, the consuls lost most of their powers and responsibilities. Though still officially the highest office of the state, with the emperor's superior imperium they were merely a symbol of Rome's republican heritage. One of the two consular positions was often occupied by emperors themselves and eventually became reserved solely for the emperor. However, the imperial consuls maintained the right to preside at meetings of the Senate, exercising this right at the pleasure of the emperor. They partially administered justice in extraordinary cases, and presented games in the Circus Maximus and all public solemnities in honor of the emperor at their own expense.

After the expiration of their offices, the ex-consuls usually governed one of the provinces that were administered by the Senate. They usually served proconsular terms of three to five years.

Consular dating
Roman dates were customarily kept according to the names of the two consuls who took office that year, much like a regnal year in a monarchy. For instance, the year 59 BC in the modern calendar was called by the Romans "the consulship of Caesar and Bibulus", since the two colleagues in the consulship were Gaius Julius Caesar and Marcus Calpurnius Bibulus, although Caesar dominated the consulship so thoroughly that year that it was jokingly referred to as "the consulship of Julius and Caesar". The date the consuls took office varied: from 222 BC to 153 BC they took office 15 March, and due to the Second Celtiberian War, from 153 BC onwards the consuls took office on 1 January. The practice of dating years ab urbe condita (from the supposed foundation date of Rome) was less frequently used.

In Latin, the ablative absolute construction is frequently used to express the date, such as "M. Messalla et M. Pupio Pisone consulibus", translated literally as "Marcus Messalla and Marcus Pupius Piso being the consuls", which appears in Caesar's De Bello Gallico.
 
Consular Dating Key

 509–479 BC: 1 September–29 August (August had only 29 days in Ancient Rome)
 478–451 BC: 1 August–31 July
 449–403 BC: 13 December–12 December
 402–393 BC: 1 October–29 September (September had 29 days)
 392–329 BC: 1 July–29 June (29 days)
 222–154 BC: 15 March–14 March
 153–46 BC: 1 January–29 December (29 days)

Epigraphy

The word consul is abbreviated as COS. The disappearance of the N is explained by the fact that in Classical Latin an N before a fricative is pronounced as a nasalization of the previous vowel (meaning consul is pronounced /kõːsul/).

Also, consul is pronounced [ko:sul], as shown in ancient writing, "COSOL", whereas the classical spelling (consul) seems like an etymological reminder of the nasal consonant. If a senator held the consulship twice then: COS becomes COS II; thrice becomes COS III, etc.

Lists of Roman consuls
For a complete list of Roman consuls, see:
 List of Roman consuls
 List of undated Roman consuls
 List of consuls designate

See also

 
 
Consul (Gallic Empire)

References

Bibliography 

 
 
 
 

 
Ancient Roman titles